Beryl Levinger is an American academic and educator. She is professor of international development at the Middlebury Institute of International Studies at Monterey, California.

Biography
Levinger is an international development professional who focuses on five core areas: strategic planning; education; evaluation; capacity development; and health. She is a frequent contributor to the work of Root Change, a US-based social venture organization.

Levinger has worked in over 90 countries for multiple international development organizations, including the World Bank, USAID, Save the Children, CARE, AFS International, the Carter Center, the International Committee of the Red Cross, Grameen Foundation, and the Inter-American Development Bank. A graduate of the Bronx High School of Science, Cornell University, and the University of Alabama, Levinger also served (until 2018) as distinguished visiting professor within Emory University's Master's in Development Practice program.

Currently, Levinger plays a number of key roles at the Middlebury Institute of International Studies in addition to serving as distinguished professor. She chairs the Development Practice and Policy Program, is academic director for the program in Design, Partnering, Management, and Innovation (DPMI), and is Middlebury's curricular innovation officer.

Levinger is one of the three co-founders (along with Vicky Colbert and Oscar Mogollon) of the highly acclaimed Escuela Nueva movement that began in Colombia. She is also founder of the Coverdell Peace Corps Fellows Program and was part of the team that founded InterAction, the leading association of US-based NGOs. Among her books are Human Capacity Development Across the Lifespan and Nutrition, Health, Education and for All. In 1996, she delivered the ninth annual Martin J. Forman Memorial Lecture (Capacity, Capital and Calories), based on her research regarding the interplay among learning outcomes, nutrition and health.

Levinger served as director or co-director of research for all but one of the annual Save the Children's State of the World's Mothers Report.  In 2016, the organization retired that report and introduced in its stead  an annual End of Childhood Report; Levinger is research co-director for this new publication, which compares the nature of childhood across 175 countries.

References

External links
 Middlebury Institute of International Studies Faculty

Middlebury College faculty
Living people
Year of birth missing (living people)